Future-oriented technology analysis (FTA) is a collective term from futures studies for analyzing future technology and its consequences. It includes technology intelligence, technology forecasting, technology roadmapping, technology assessment, and technology foresight. Technology Futures Analysis or Technology Future Analysis (TFA) is a synonym.  

Future-oriented technology analysis shares common methods with horizon scanning.

Definitions

Methods

References

Technology assessment
Technology forecasting